The 1996 Copenhagen Open was a men's tennis tournament played on indoor carpet courts at the K.B. Hallen in Copenhagen, Denmark and was part of the World Series of the 1996 ATP Tour. It was the eighth edition of the tournament and was held from 11 March until 17 March 1996. Third-seeded Cédric Pioline won the singles title.

Finals

Singles

 Cédric Pioline defeated  Kenneth Carlsen 6–2, 7–6(9–7)
 It was Pioline's 1st singles title of his career.

Doubles

 Libor Pimek /  Byron Talbot defeated  Wayne Arthurs /  Andrew Kratzmann 7–6, 3–6, 6–3
 It was Pimek's 2nd title of the year and the 15th of his career. It was Talbot's 1st title of the year and the 10th of his career.

References

External links
 ITF tournament edition details

Copenhagen Open
Copenhagen Open
1996 in Danish tennis